Trigonorhinus alternatus is a species of fungus weevil in the beetle family Anthribidae. It is found in North America.

References

Further reading

 
 

Anthribidae
Articles created by Qbugbot
Beetles described in 1827